The 2010 Standard Bank Pro20 season was the seventh season of the Standard Bank Pro20 Series, established by the Cricket South Africa in 2010. The series was played between 3 February and 12 March 2010. The tournament was won by the Warriors, who defeated the Highveld Lions in the final.

Venues

Rules and regulations
Points were awarded as follows:

 The team that achieves a run rate of 1.25 times that of the opposition shall be rewarded one bonus point.
 A team's run rate will be calculated by reference to the runs scored in an innings divided by the number of overs faced.

Teams and standings

(C) = Eventual Champion; (R) = Runner-up.
Note: The winner and runner-up qualified for the 2010 Champions League Twenty20.

Results

Group stage

Knockout stage

Fixtures
All times shown are in South African Standard Time (UTC+02).

Group stage

Knockout stage
At the end of the group stage, the top four teams qualify for the semi-finals. The semi-finals are best-of-three playoffs, with the top seed facing the fourth seed and the second seed facing the third seed. If a match in the knockout stage ends with a tie, a Super Over will determine the winner.

Semi-finals

Final

References

External links
 CricketArchive
 Cricinfo
 Supersport
 Twenty20

South African domestic cricket competitions
Domestic cricket competitions in 2009–10
2009–10 South African cricket season